The Japanese Spanish mackerel (Scomberomorus niphonius), also known as the Japanese seer fish, is a species of true mackerel in the scombrid family (Scombridae). Their maximum reported length is 100 cm, and the maximum reported weight is 10.57 kg.

Fisheries
Japanese Spanish mackerel is an important species for fisheries in east Asia. South Korea is the country reporting the biggest annual catches, followed by Japan and Taiwan. These added to a relatively modest total catch of about 56,000 tonnes in 2009. However, China reports very large catches of unidentified seer fish (Scomberomorus spp., fluctuating around 400,000 tonnes in 2000–2009), without reporting catches of any single Scomberomorus species. It is likely that these catches include a significant proportion of Japanese Spanish mackerel.

As food

Japanese Spanish mackerel is commonly served grilled or pan-fried in Korea as samchi-gui (food).
Japanese Spanish mackerel is often served as sushi, under the Japanese name sawara (鰆, サワラ).

Notes

References

 

Japanese Spanish mackerel
Fish of China
Fish of Japan
East China Sea
South China Sea
Japanese Spanish mackerel
Japanese Spanish mackerel